Real Live Roadrunning is a collaborative live album by British singer-songwriter and guitarist Mark Knopfler and American singer-songwriter Emmylou Harris, released on 14 November 2006 by Mercury Records and Universal Music internationally, and by Warner Bros. Records in the United States. The album was recorded live on 28 June 2006 at the Gibson Amphitheatre in Los Angeles, at the end of their summer tour in support of their critically acclaimed album, All the Roadrunning. Real Live Roadrunning was released as a combined CD/DVD.

Artwork
The album cover is the second album release that prominently features Knopfler's National Style 0 Resonator guitar, the same that is featured on the cover of Brothers in Arms, the top-selling album with his former band, Dire Straits.

Critical reception

In his review for AllMusic, James Christopher Monger gave the album three out of five stars, writing that the musicianship "is as flawless as expected, but there's not a whole lot to separate the tunes here from their studio sisters." Mongers concluded, "The accompanying DVD is a much better example of the pair's quiet dynamic, allowing both the duo and its talented band a broader spectrum on which to emit their wry tales of love, loss, and life."

In his review for The Music Box, John Metzger gave the album three and a half out of five stars, writing that although the performances are "impeccable", the set remains "a flawed affair". Metzger believed that the songs and arrangements are too similar to the studio versions on All the Roadrunning, and that the differences between the live versions and the studio versions are mostly subtle. Metzger believed that the true highlights of Real Live Roadrunning are the renewed versions of songs taken from the solo works of Knopfler and Harris, such as "Romeo and Juliet", "Speedway at Nazareth", and "Red Dirt Girl". Metzger concluded, "Understandably, in transforming their work for the stage, Knopfler and Harris were forced to swap subtlety for zeal, but as the accompanying video makes clear, they still succeeded in retaining the charming intimacy that made All the Roadrunning such a superlative collection in the first place."

Track listing
All songs were written by Mark Knopfler, except where indicated.

Personnel
Music
 Mark Knopfler – guitar, vocals
 Emmylou Harris – guitar, vocals
 Guy Fletcher – keyboards
 Richard Bennett – guitar
 Danny Cummings – drums
 Stuart Duncan – fiddle, mandolin
 Matt Rollings – keyboards
 Glenn Worf – bass

CD Production
 Guy Fletcher – producer, engineer, mixing
 Richard Cooper – assistant engineer
 Graham Meek – assistant engineer
 Bob Ludwig – mastering
 Danny Clinch – photography
 Stephan Walker – art direction
 Mark Holly – design

DVD

Real Live Roadrunning is a collaborative live concert DVD by British singer-songwriter and guitarist Mark Knopfler and American singer-songwriter Emmylou Harris, released on 14 November 2006 by Mercury Records and Universal Music internationally, and by Warner Bros. Records in the United States. The DVD contains a 91-minute concert, plus special features, including a documentary and interviews.

Track listing

Personnel
DVD Production
 Martyn Atkins – director
 James Pluta – producer
 James Beug – executive producer
 Diarmuid Quinn – co-producer
 Peter Standish – co-producer
 David May – post production producer
 Ted Hall – post audio mixer
 Richard Riqué Patier – hair and makeup (EH)

Charts and certifications

Albums

Certifications

References

Albums produced by Guy Fletcher
Mark Knopfler video albums
Emmylou Harris live albums
2006 live albums
Warner Records live albums
Live video albums
2006 video albums
Warner Records video albums
Collaborative albums